Metroway is a bus rapid transit (BRT) line operated by the Washington Metropolitan Area Transit Authority (WMATA) as part of their Metrobus system. It consists of a single line operating in Arlington and Alexandria, Virginia. It opened on August 24, 2014. It is the first bus rapid transit line to open in Virginia and in the Washington metropolitan area.

Route
The service runs from its northern end at the Pentagon City south through Crystal City and Potomac Yard before ending at the Braddock Road Metrorail station. The service runs along a bus-only roadway along Richmond Highway (U.S. Route 1) in Alexandria between Potomac and East Glebe stations, as well as a busway in Arlington. The remainder of the service runs on mixed-traffic roadways.

Stations 

There are 17 stations on the route.

The Metroway stations vary depending on location and jurisdiction, though all stations consist of side platforms and sidewalk-level bus stops.

Service

Metroway operates seven days a week with longer hours and more frequent service during weekdays. All runs take place on board the New Flyer Xcelsior XN40 CNG buses with Metroway livery, which replaced the original NABI 42 BRT Hybrid buses on December 18, 2016.

Connections

As a WMATA Metrobus service, Metroway is integrated within the regional transit network, and is subject to the same fares and transfer rules as any other local Metrobus service. The Braddock Road, Crystal City, and Pentagon City stations offer service for the Metrorail Yellow Line and Blue Line. As it parallels the Yellow and Blue Lines between Pentagon City and Braddock Road, it can be used as an alternative to Metrorail during service outages on Metrorail.

The Crystal City VRE station is a short distance (0.1 mile; 160 meters) away from the 18th & Crystal station.

Metroway provides connections to the Mount Vernon Trail at the 18th & Crystal station, and the Four Mile Run Trail at the South Glebe station. Capital Bikeshare stations exist at or near several Metroway stations.

Expansions

Metroway has been expanded since its opening in 2014, both in number of stations and length of route. Two new stations opened in Arlington, both in April 2016. Fayette station in Alexandria opened in 2017.

On April 17, 2016, the 33rd & Crystal and Pentagon City stations opened, bringing the total number of operating stations to 15. At the same time, a dedicated transit lane and a peak period transit lane opened in Arlington. While the Fayette and 33rd & Crystal stations are infill stations along the existing route, the addition of the Pentagon City station extended the route north, which changed the northern terminus from Crystal City to Pentagon City. The 33rd & Crystal stop offers two-way service, while Pentagon City, the new northern terminus is southbound-only.

The National Capital Region Transportation Planning Board wants to extend the dedicated transitway in Crystal City North to the Pentagon City Metro station.

Beginning May 25, 2019, as a result of the Blue and Yellow Lines being shut down south of National Airport for the summer, new stops were added on Potomac Avenue at East Glebe Road near the Kaiser Permanente and the National Institute for the Blind (NIB) Headquarters.

As part of the Amazon HQ2 project, plans were made in 2019 to extend the dedicated transitway to the section between Crystal City and Pentagon City, and add new stops at 12th & Clark Street, 12th & Elm Street, 12th & Hayes Street, and Army-Navy Drive. Construction began in April 2022, with completion expected in April 2023.

See also 
 GRTC Pulse, a bus rapid transit system in Richmond, Virginia
 VB Wave, a bus rapid transit system in Virginia Beach, Virginia
 National Landing—a new cross-jurisdictional neighborhood that will house the Amazon HQ2 and Virginia Tech Innovation Center.

References

External links
 
 

 
2014 establishments in Virginia
Bus rapid transit in Virginia
Transport infrastructure completed in 2014
Metroway